Jingurudó is a corregimiento in Sambú District, Comarca Emberá, Panama with a population of 8,369 as of 2010. It was created by Law 22 of November 8, 1983. Its population as of 1990 was 533; its population as of 2000 was 537.

References

Corregimientos of Comarca Emberá-Wounaan